Oru Naal Koothu is a 2016 Indian Tamil-language romantic comedy drama film directed by Nelson Venkatesan and produced by J. Selva Kumar, featuring Dinesh, Miya, Nivetha Pethuraj, Abhinav, and Riythvika in lead roles. Lingesh, Karunakaran, Ramesh Thilak, Bala Saravanan, and Nagineedu play supporting roles.

The title references the fuss over the wedding day of an Indian marriage. The story is based on the experiences of Nelson Venkatesan himself.

The music was composed by Justin Prabhakaran with cinematography by Gokul Benoy and editing by V J Sabu Joseph. The film released on 9 June 2016 to positive reviews from critics.

Plot
Three women face different challenges in their process of getting married, which are very typical to the Indian society.

Rajkumar, who is in love with his colleague Kavya, is reluctant to marry her, since he is insecure about her coming from a wealthier background, so much so that he delays any discussion about their marriage and asks her to wait till he makes something of himself. This causes a strain in their relationship, and they ultimately break up with Kavya agreeing to marry a guy of her father's choice.

Lakshmi is visited by several suitors, and every one of them is rejected by her father, as he is too greedy to settle for a middle class son-in-law. One such suitor named Mukundan really likes her, but his family rejects the match citing Lakshmi's economic status. In spite of that, Mukundan convinces Lakshmi to come to his place, so that they can get married. She does so, but in the bus depot of his town, Mukundan's family spots both of them together and drags Mukundan back home, taunting and insulting the mortified Lakshmi. With a heavy heart, she boards another bus to get back home.

Susheela's family has been trying to get her married for the past few years, but none of them seem interested in her, citing her looks, her unconventional job, etc. as their reason. These experiences makes her vexed and withdrawn in her social life. The only person who understands her is her colleague Sathish. One of her prospective suitors named Bhaskar agrees to marry Susheela, but he gets cold feet and ends up canceling the marriage at the last moment. Then he tries avoiding Susheela and insults her every time she demands an explanation as to why he called off the wedding. Finally, Susheela's brother Raghavendran convinces Bhaskar to marry Susheela, but she rejects the proposal as she realises that she is in love with Sathish.

Kavya's wedding is fixed with the guy of her father's choice, but on the day before her marriage, Raj, who travels along with Shoulder in a car to the venue, avoids crashing into Lakshmi's bus (who is on her return journey to her place and alights the bus to have coffee) and diverts the car, because of which a relative of Kavya's fiancée (who travels in the same road in another car) crashes and dies instantly. Due to this, Kavya is labeled as bad luck, and her marriage is called off. Raj arrives on time at the venue, but before that, her parents ask her to call Raj and ask for his hand in marriage but she refuses, as she guesses that would make him feel like being used as a second option. So Kavya chooses Sathish (one of her relatives) as her partner and marries him.

In the end, we see Raj getting engaged to Lakshmi after a year, depicting the irony of the whole arranged marriage system, that is so deeply rooted in the Indian society.

Cast

Production
The production house agreed to finance the film, after gaining profits while working on Dinesh's previous film, Thirudan Police (2014). The film began production in March 2015 in Dindigul, where scenes involving Mia George were shot. Nivetha Pethuraj, a former beauty contestant winner from UAE, was selected to portray another leading female role in the film.

Soundtrack
The music and soundtracks were composed by Pannaiyarum Padminiyum fame Justin Prabhakaran. The soundtrack features five songs, the lyrics for which are written by Madhan Karky, Vivek, Veera, Sankar Dass and Gopalakrishna Bharathi. Behindwoods rated the album 3 out of 5 and called it "Justin delivers a soothing album."

References

External links
 

2016 films
Indian drama films
Films scored by Justin Prabhakaran
Hyperlink films
Films about Indian weddings
2010s Tamil-language films
2016 directorial debut films